Linguistics is the scientific study of human language. Someone who engages in this study is called a linguist. See also the Outline of linguistics, the List of phonetics topics, the List of linguists, and the List of cognitive science topics. Articles related to linguistics include:

A 
Abbreviation -
Abessive case -
Ablaut -
Absolutive case -
Abugida -
Accusative case -
Acute accent -
Accent (phonetics) -
Accent (sociolinguistics) -
Acronym -
Adessive case -
Adjective -
Adjunct -
Adposition -
Adpositional phrase -
Adverb -
Adverbial -
Adverbial phrase -
Affix -
Affricate consonant -
Agglutination -
Agglutinative language -
Allative case -
Allomorph -
Allophone -
Alphabet -
Analytic language -
Anaphora -
Animacy -
Anthropological linguistics -
Alveolar consonant -
Antonym -
Aorist -
Applied linguistics -
Approximant -
Areal feature -
Article -
Articulatory gestures -
Articulatory phonetics -
Aspect -
Asterisk -
Attrition -
Attraction -
Augment (Bantu languages) -
Augment (Indo-European) -
Auxiliary verb

B 
Back-formation -
Backronym -
Bilabial consonant -
Breathy voice -
Breve

C 
Calque -
Capitalization -
Capitonym -
Cardinal vowel -
Case -
Case in tiers -
Cedilla -
Chiasmus -
Circumfix -
Circumflex -
Clefting -
Click consonant -
Closed-class word -
Cognate -
Cognitive science -
Coherence -
Colloquialism -
Comitative case -
Comparative -
Comparative linguistics -
Comparative method -
Compound noun and adjective -
Compound verb -
Computer-assisted language learning -
Computational linguistics -
Conjugation -
Conjunct -
Conjunction -
Consonant -
Constructed language -
Context -
Contrastive analysis -
Contrastive linguistics -
Conversation analysis -
Copula -
Corpus linguistics -
Cranberry morpheme -
Creaky voice -
Creole language -
Cryptanalysis -
Cuneiform

D 
Dangling modifier -
Dative case -
Decipherment -
Declension -
Defective verb -
Descriptive linguistics -
Dental consonant -
Derivation -
Determiner -
Diacritic -
Diaeresis -
Dialect -
Dictionary -
Diphthong -
Diplomatics -
Discourse -
Disjunct -
Dislocation -
Double acute accent -
Dual grammatical number

E 
Eggcorn -
Ecolinguistics -
Elative case -
Endangered language -
English pronunciation -
Entailment -
Ergative case -
Error -
Essive case -
Ethnologue -
Etymology -
Etymologist -
Eurolinguistics -
Evolution of languages -
Evolutionary linguistics -
Example-based machine translation -
Exegesis -
Expletive -
Expletive attributive

F 
False cognate -
False friend -
Formal language -
Fricative consonant -
Function word -
Fusional language -
Future perfect -
Future tense

G 
Gender -
General semantics -
Genitive case -
Germanic umlaut -
Gerund -
Glottal consonant -
Glottal stop -
Glottochronology -
Government -
Grammar -
Grammatical gender -
Grammatical mood -
Grammatical number -
Grammatical voice -
Grave accent -
Great consonant shift -
Great Vowel Shift -
Grimm's law -
Guttural consonant

H 
Hacek -
Heaps' law -
Hermeneutics -
Hiatus (linguistics) -
High rising terminal -
Historical-comparative linguistics -
Historical linguistics -
History of linguistics -
Homonym -
Hypernym -
Hyponym

I 
I-mutation -
Ideogram -
Idiolect -
Idiom -
Illative case -
Impersonal pronoun -
Impersonal verb -
Implication (pragmatics) -
Indo-European languages -
Inessive case -
Infinitive -
Infix -
Inflected language -
Inflection -
Initialism -
Initial-stress-derived noun -
Instructive case -
Interjection -
Interactional linguistics -
International Phonetic Alphabet -
IPA chart for English -
Irregular verb

J

K

L 
Labiodental consonant -
Langue and parole -
Language -
Language acquisition -
Language attrition -
Language education -
Language families and languages -
Language game -
The Language Instinct -
Language isolate -
Laryngeal theory -
Lateral consonant -
Lemma -
Lexeme -
Lexical semantics -
Lexicography -
Lexicology -
Lexicon -
Linguist -
Linguistic anthropology -
Linguistic ecology -
Linguistic layers -
Linguistic relativity -
Linguistics -
Linguistics basic topics -
Liquid consonant -
List of linguists -
Loanword -
Locative case

M 
Machine translation -
macron -
Manner of articulation - Mass noun -
Meaning -
Meronymy -
Metathesis -
Minimal pair -
Mispronunciation -
Modality -
Mood -
Mora -
Morpheme -
Morphology -
Mutual intelligibility

N 
Nasal consonant -
Nasal stop -
Natural language -
Natural language processing -
Natural language understanding -
Neologism -
Neurolinguistics -
Nomenclature -
Nominative case -
Noun -
Noun phrase -
Null morpheme

O 
Onomasiology -
Onomatopoeia -
Open class word -
Optimality theory -
Origin of language -
Orthography -
Object–subject–verb -
Object–verb–subject -
Oxytone

P 
Palatal consonant -
Paradigm -
Paroxytone -
Part of speech -
Participle -
Particle -
Partitive case -
Past tense -
Perfect (grammar) -
Persuasion -
Pharyngeal consonant -
Philology -
Philosophy of language -
Phonation -
Phone -
Phonetics -
Phonetic complement -
Phonetic transcription -
Phonology -
Phoneme -
Phonemics -
Phrase -
Phrase structure rules -
Pidgin -
Place of articulation -
Pleonasm -
Pluperfect -
Polysemy -
Polysynthetic language -
Portmanteau -
Possessive case -
Postalveolar consonant -
Postposition -
Pragmatics -
Prefix -
Preposition -
Prepositional phrase -
Prescription and description -
Present tense -
Presupposition -
Preterite -
Principles of interpretation -
Profanity -
Prolative case -
Pronoun -
Pronunciation -
Prosody (linguistics) -
Proparoxytone -
Pseudo-acronym -
Pseudo-Anglicism -
Psycholinguistics -
Punctuation

Q 
Quirky subject

R 
Radical -
Regimen -
Retroflex consonant -
Retronym -
Rhetoric - 
Rhotics -
Romanization -
Rounded vowel

S 
SAMPA -
Schwa -
Second language -
Semantics -
Semantic class -
Semantic feature -
Semantic property -
Semiotics -
Semivowel -
Sentence -
Sentence function -
Shall -
Sign -
Sign language -
Sociolinguistics -
Sociolect -
Sociophonetics -
Slack voice -
Slang -
Sound change -
Sound pattern of English -
SOV -
Speaker recognition -
Specialised lexicography -
Speech communication -
Speech act -
Speech disorder -
Speech processing -
Speech recognition -
Speech synthesis -
Speech therapy -
Spiritus asper -
Split infinitive -
Standard language -
Stop consonant -
Stratificational linguistics -
Structuralism -
Stylistics -
Subcategorization-
Superlative -
Suppletion -
Subject -
SVO -
Supine -
Syllabary -
Syllable -
Synonym -
Syntactic ambiguity -
Syntactic categories -
Syntax -
Synthetic language

T 
Tagmemics -
Telicity -
Tense -
Tense–aspect–mood -
Terminology -
Text linguistics -
Text types -
Thematic role -
Theoretical linguistics -
Thesaurus -
Thou -
Time–manner–place -
Tonal language -
Tone (linguistics) -
Tongue-twister -
Transcription -
Transformational-generative grammar -
Translation -
Translative case -
Truth condition -
T–V distinction -
Typology

U 
Uninflected word -
Universal grammar -
Unsolved problems in linguistics -
Uvular consonant

V 
V2 word order -
Variety -
Velar consonant -
Verb -
Verb–object–subject -
Verb phrase -
Verb–subject–object -
Verbal noun -
Verner's law -
Vocative case -
Vowel -
Vowel harmony -
Vowel stems -

W 
Weak suppletion -
Will (verb) -
Word -
Word-sense disambiguation -
Writing -
Writing systems -
Wug test

X 
X-bar theory

Y

Z 
Zipf's law

Linguistics lists
Linguistics topics